The Texas Finswimming Association (TFA) is the official governing body for competitive and recreational finswimming in Texas. The TFA consists of competitive teams, high schools, colleges, individual athletes, supporters, and others who are interested in advancing the sport of finswimming in the Lone Star State.

Organization 

The TFA is governed by a board of directors. Each board serves for the duration of the Olympiad, with the current board serving until December 31, 2024.

The board of directors for the current Olympiad (2020-2024) is as follows:

 President: Darla S. Kelly – Deer Park, Texas
 Vice president: Kristine Kelly – Deer Park, Texas
 Secretary: Donna Alicoate – Broadway, Virginia
 Treasurer: Chris Price - Pasadena, Texas
 Executive director: Robert H. Kelly – Deer Park, Texas
 Director of media and public relations: Chris Price – Pasadena, Texas
 Director of special programs: Taylor Hart – Houston, Texas
 Athlete representative: Kirstin Kelly – Pasadena, Texas

The executive committee of the board of directors of the Texas Finswimming Association consists of the positions of president, vice president, secretary, treasurer, and executive director. The executive director is the chairman of the executive committee. This committee has the task of formulating and establishing rule changes for the sport.

Competitions

In addition, Texas has hosted the majority of the finswimming competitions in the US for the past 6–8 years. Texas hosts the Texas Open Finswimming Invitational, the Gulf Coast International Finswimming Invitational, along with the Texas State Finswimming Championships every year.

In addition TFA also host 2–3 high school finswimming meets a year for those schools who have finswimming as part of their official athletic program.

Finswimmers from Texas have competed in numerous national and international competitions over the years, including the 1998 USA Fin Swimming National Championships, 2000 CMAS World Finswimming Championships, 2001 World Scholar-Athlete Games, 2006 World Scholar-Athlete Games, 1999 United States Scholar-Athlete Games, 2003 United States Scholar-Athlete Games, 2008 United States Scholar-Athlete Games and the Gulf Coast International Finswimming Invitational.

Competitive/performance suits

It was decided by the Executive Committee on October 1, 2009, that competitive performance suits would be allowed in all competitions in Texas. There shall be no restrictions on the type of suit worn in any recognized or sanctioned finswimming competition.

Records

Short course yards

Men 

The records listed are correct as of July 1, 2022. Updates will be made when official results are confirmed and ratified by the Texas Finswimming Association and its board of directors.

Women 

The records listed are correct as of July 1, 2022. Updates will be made when official results are confirmed and ratified by the Texas Finswimming Association and its board of directors.

Long course meters

Men 

The records listed are correct as of July 1, 2022. Updates will be made when official results are confirmed and ratified by the Texas Finswimming Association and its board of directors.

Women 

The records listed are correct as of July 1, 2022. Updates will be made when official results are confirmed and ratified by the Texas Finswimming Association and its board of directors.

See also

References

External links
 Texas Finswimming Association
 Texas Finswimming Association (archive site)
 Underwater Society of America

Finswimming
Diving organizations
Underwater sport in the United States